Protarchaeopteryx  (meaning "before Archaeopteryx") is a genus of turkey-sized feathered theropod dinosaur from China. Known from the Jianshangou bed of the Yixian Formation, it lived during the early Aptian age of the Early Cretaceous, approximately 124.6 million years ago. It was probably a herbivore or omnivore, although its hands were very similar to those of small carnivorous dinosaurs. It appears to be one of the most basal members of the Oviraptorosauria, closely related to Incisivosaurus, or a taxon slightly less closely related to birds than oviraptorosaurs were.

Description

The holotype and only known specimen of Protarchaeopteryx is NGMC 2125, a partial skeleton.

Protarchaeopteryx had long legs, and could have been a quick runner. It had well-developed, vaned feathers extended from a relatively short tail; the hands were long and slender, and had three fingers with sharp, curved claws. Its bones were hollow and bird-like, and it possessed a wishbone. Protarchaeopteryx also had symmetrical feathers on its tail. Since modern birds that have symmetrical feathers are flightless, and the skeletal structure of Protarchaeopteryx would not support flapping flight, it is assumed that it was flightless as well. It has been suggested that it could have had an arboreal lifestyle, jumping from tree limbs and using its forelimbs for a form of parachuting.

See also

 Timeline of oviraptorosaur research

References

External links
Diagram showing known pieces after Protarchaeopteryx
Life restoration

Early Cretaceous dinosaurs of Asia
Feathered dinosaurs
Oviraptorosaurs
Fossil taxa described in 1997
Yixian fauna